Oocelyphus is a genus of beetle flies. It is known from the Oriental realm.

Species
O. coniferis Shi, 1998
O. nigritus Shi, 1998
O. tarsalis Chen, 1949
O. uncatis Shi, 1998

References

Celyphidae
Diptera of Asia
Lauxanioidea genera